The Clermont Set was an exclusive group of rich British gamblers who met at the Clermont Club, originally at 44 Berkeley Square, in London's fashionable Mayfair district. It closed in March 2018 and re-opened in 2022. Clermont Club is now temporarily closed.

Premises
The house at 44 Berkeley Square was built in 1740 (to the design of the architect William Kent) by Lady Isabella Finch (1700–1771), the 7th daughter of Daniel Finch, 7th Earl of Winchilsea, 2nd Earl of Nottingham (1647–1730). It is famed for its theatrical staircase and large Grand Saloon, "one of the finest rooms of its scale and period in London", the design of which was based on the famous Double Cube Room at Wilton House in Wiltshire. She never married but became Lady of the Bedchamber to Princess Amelia, a spinster aunt of King George III. It was purchased after her death by William Henry Fortescue, 1st Earl of Clermont (1722–1806), an Irish peer, and served as his London townhouse.

History
It was the first London casino opened by John Aspinall after he received a gaming licence under Britain's new gambling law. Aspinall sold the club in 1972 to Playboy Enterprises, which was forced to sell it in 1982 when it lost its licence.

Members
The club was founded in 1962 by John Aspinall and the original membership included five dukes, five marquesses, almost twenty earls and two cabinet ministers.

Society figures who frequented the club included Peter Sellers, Ian Fleming, David Stirling, Lucian Freud, Lord Lucan, Lord Derby, Lord Boothby, and the Duke of Devonshire.

Businessman members included James Goldsmith, Tiny Rowland, Gianni Agnelli, Jim Slater, and Kerry Packer.

Private Eye allegations
In 1976 Goldsmith initiated a libel action against the satirical magazine Private Eye, which had alleged that members of the Clermont Set, including Goldsmith, had conspired to shelter Lord Lucan after Lucan was suspected of murdering his family nanny, Sandra Rivett. Goldsmith won a partial victory and eventually reached a settlement with the magazine.

See also
 The Mayfair Set, a 1999 BAFTA Award-winning documentary series by Adam Curtis describing how buccaneer capitalists were allowed to shape the climate of the Thatcher years, focusing on members of the Clermont Club.

References

English gamblers
Mayfair